The 2013 season was St. Patrick's Athletic F.C.'s 84th year in existence and their 62nd consecutive season in the League of Ireland. It was the second year that Liam Buckley was the team's manager, following replacing Pete Mahon in December 2011. St Pat's finished the season as the 2013 League of Ireland Premier Division champions. They were also Leinster Senior Cup runners up. They also competed in the UEFA Europa League, the FAI Cup, the Setanta Cup and the League of Ireland Cup.

Squad

Transfers

Preseason

In

Out

Summer

In

Out

Squad statistics

Appearances, goals and cards
Number in brackets represents (of which were substituted ON).
Last Updated – 26 October 2013

Top scorers
Includes all competitive matches.
Last updated 26 October 2013

Top Assists
Includes all competitive matches.
Last updated 26 October 2013

Top Clean Sheets
Includes all competitive matches.
Last updated 26 October 2013

Disciplinary record

Captains

Club

Technical Staff
Manager: Liam Buckley
Assistant Manager: Harry Kenny
Head Of Player Recruitment, Chief Scout, Coach: Dave Campbell
Strength and Conditioning Coach: Ger McDermott
Video Analysis: Graham Buckley
Goalkeeping Coach: Pat Jennings Jr.

Kit

|
|
|
|
|
|
|}
The club's home and home alternate kits were retained from the 2012 season, with new away and third kits released for the season.

Matchdays

Days

Times

Televised Matches

Channels

Competitions

League of Ireland

The 2013 League of Ireland fixtures were announced on 19 December 2013. St Patrick's Athletic were revealed to have Drogheda United at home in the first day of the season, with an extra special Dublin derby away to Shamrock Rovers on the second day of the season following Pats' signing Killian Brennan and Sean Gannon, whilst Rovers signed James Chambers, Sean O'Connor, Barry Murphy and also assistant manager Trevor Croly as manager, from the Saints.

League table

Results summary

Results by round

Matches

FAI Cup

Second round

Third round

Quarter-final

Setanta Cup
The draw for the first round of the Setanta Cup took place on the sixth of December 2012. St Patrick's Athletic were drawn to play Irish League side Glentoran, with the first leg at home in Richmond Park on Monday 11 February 2013 live on Setanta Sports and the return leg on the 18th at The Oval in Belfast.

First round

EA Sports Cup

Second round

Quarter-final

Leinster Senior Cup

Fourth round

Quarter-final

Semi-final

Final

Europa League

1st qualifying round

Preseason friendlies

Records

Overall
{|class="wikitable" style="text-align: center;"
|-
!
!Total
!Home 
!Away
|-
|align=left| Games played          || 46 || 24 || 22
|-
|align=left| Games won             || 27 || 13 || 14
|-
|align=left| Games drawn           || 9 || 8 || 2
|-
|align=left| Games lost            || 8  || 4 || 5
|-
|align=left| Biggest win           || 5-0 vs UCD || 5-0 vs UCD || 4-0 vs Shamrock Rovers
|-
|align=left| Biggest loss          || 3-0 vs Shamrock Rovers || 2-1 vs Dundalk, VMFD Žalgiris || 3-0 vs Shamrock Rovers
|-
|align=left| Biggest win (League)  || 5-0 vs UCD || 5-0 vs UCD || 4-0 vs Shamrock Rovers
|-
|align=left| Biggest win (Cup)     || 4-0 vs UCD || 4-0 vs UCD || 3-0 vs Bray Wanderers
|-
|align=left| Biggest win (Europe)  || N/A || N/A || N/A
|-
|align=left| Biggest loss (League) || 3-0 vs Shamrock Rovers || 2-1 vs Dundalk || 3-0 vs Shamrock Rovers
|-
|align=left| Biggest loss (Cup)    || 2-0 vs Shamrock Rovers || 2-0 vs Shamrock Rovers || 1-0 vs Glentoran, 2-1 vs Shamrock Rovers
|-
|align=left| Biggest loss (Europe) || 2-1 vs VMFD Žalgiris || 2-1 vs VMFD Žalgiris || N/A
|-
|align=left| Clean sheets          || 24 || 14 || 10
|-
|align=left| Goals scored          || 76 || 39 || 37
|-
|align=left| Goals conceded        || 30 || 13 || 19
|-
|align=left| Goal difference       || 47 || 26 || 17
|-
|align=left| Consecutive Victories || 7 || 4 || 8
|-
|align=left| Unbeaten run          || 15 || 10 || 8
|-
|align=left| Consecutive Defeats   || 1 || 0 || 2
|-
|align=left| Winless Run           || 4 || 3 || 4
|-
|-
|-
|align=left| Points (League)               || 71/99 (74%) || 34/51 (67%) || 35/50 (74%)
|-
|align=left| Winning rate         || 60% || 54% || 67% 
|-
|align=left| Most appearances     || Conan Byrne – 44 || Conan Byrne –  24 || Ger O'Brien –  20
|-
|align=left| Top scorer           || Conan Byrne – 13 || Conan Byrne – 6 || Conan Byrne – 7
|-

References

External links
St Patrick's Athletic FC Website
St Patrick's Athletic Supporters Forum
2013 St Patrick's Athletic F.C. season at Soccerway

St Patrick's Athletic
2013